The Poison Seas is a Big Finish Productions audio drama featuring Lisa Bowerman as Bernice Summerfield, a character from the spin-off media based on the long-running British science fiction television series Doctor Who.

Plot 
Bernice returns to the planet Chosan to help a Sea Devil colony who are under threat from terrorists. She soon realises that the colony, and the entire planet, is actually in danger from something far worse.

Cast
Bernice Summerfield - Lisa Bowerman
Irving Braxiatel - Miles Richardson
Principal Lurnix - Ifan Huw Dafydd
Clinician Nedda - Nicky Goldie
Joanne Carver - Jenny Livsey
Ressix - Mat Dineen

External links
Big Finish Productions - Professor Bernice Summerfield: The Poison Seas

Bernice Summerfield audio plays
Fiction set in the 27th century